Kodjovi Mawuéna (born 31 December 1959) is a former Togo international football player and manager.

Club career
Born in Tsévié, Mawuéna played club football in the local leagues.

International career
Mawuéna made appearances for the Togo national football team, including one FIFA World Cup qualifying match. He captained Togo at the 1984 African Cup of Nations finals.

Career as manager
After retiring from playing, Mawuéna became a manager. He led several local clubs, including OC Agaza. In 2004, he was named coach of the year while managing Dynamic Togolais.

Mawuéna was an assistant coach for the Togo national football team and became caretaker manager when Gottlieb Göller walked out during the 2000 African Cup of Nations finals. He was also named a caretaker manager for Togo during the 2006 World Cup finals when Otto Pfister and Piet Hamberg quit their posts.

References

External links

1959 births
Living people
Togolese footballers
Togo international footballers
1984 African Cup of Nations players
Togolese football managers
Togo national football team managers
Association football defenders
21st-century Togolese people